Thailand competed at the 1956 Summer Olympics in Melbourne, Australia.

It was the first time that Thailand national football team and Thailand national basketball team joined the Olympics.

Results by event

Sailing
Star
  and Luang Pradiyat Navayudh 12th place.

References
Official Olympic Reports

Nations at the 1956 Summer Olympics
1956 Summer Olympics
1956 in Thai sport